The Haidersee is a lake in South Tyrol, Italy, which belongs to the municipality of Graun im Vinschgau.

References 
Civic Network of South Tyrol 

Lakes of South Tyrol